Otitoma gouldi is a species of sea snail, a marine gastropod mollusk in the family Pseudomelatomidae.

Description
The length of the shell attains 7 mm, its diameter 2 mm.

Distribution
This marine species is found along Hong Kong and Japan.

References

 Gould, A. A. Descriptions of shells collected in the North Pacific Exploring Expedition1860. under Captains Ringgold and Rodgers. Proc. Boston Soc. Nat. Hist. 1859–1860 vol.7 p. 340
 Wiedrick S.G. (2014). Review of the genera Otitoma Jousseaume, 1880 and Thelecytharella with the description of two new species Gastropoda: Conoidea: Pseudomelatomidae) from the southwest Pacific Ocean. The Festivus. 46(3): 40–53

External links
  Tucker, J.K. 2004 Catalog of recent and fossil turrids (Mollusca: Gastropoda). Zootaxa 682:1–1295
  R.I. Johnson, The Recent Mollusca of Augustus Addison Gould; United States National Museum, bulletin 239, Washington D.C. 1964
 Kilburn R.N. (2004) The identities of Otitoma and Antimitra (Mollusca: Gastropoda: Conidae and Buccinidae). African Invertebrates, 45: 263–270
 Gastropods.com: Otitoma gouldi

gouldi
Gastropods described in 1944